Below are the squads for the 1998 AFF Championship, hosted by Vietnam, which took place between 26 August and 5 September 1998.  The players' listed age is their age on the tournament's opening day (26 August 1998).

Group A

Thailand
Coach: Withaya Laohakul

Indonesia
Coach: Rusdy Bahalwan

Myanmar
Coach  Aye Maung

Philippines
Coach:  Juan Cutillas

Group B

Singapore
Coach:  Barry Whitbread

Vietnam
Coach:  Alfred Riedl

Malaysia
Coach:  Hatem Souisi

Laos
Head coach: Songphu Phongsa

References
 Courtney, Barrie. "ASEAN ("Tiger") Cup 1998 (Vietnam) Details". RSSSF.

AFF Championship squads
squads